Theodoric I (c. 965 – between 11 April 1026 and 12 January 1027) was the count of Bar and duke of Upper Lorraine from 978 to his death. He was the son and successor of Frederick I and Beatrice, daughter of Hugh the Great, count of Paris, and sister to the French king Hugh Capet.

His mother was the regent until 987. In 985, he joined the other Lorrainer lords, including his cousin Godfrey the Prisoner, in trying to repel King Lothair of France's invasion: but at Verdun, he was captured.

Like almost all the dukes of Lorraine until the Gallicisation of the region in the thirteenth century, Theodoric was loyal to the Holy Roman Emperors.  In 1011, he aided Henry II in his war with Luxembourg.  He was captured a second time in 1018 in combat with Burgundy, but overcame Odo II of Blois, also count of Meaux, Chartres, and Troyes (later Champagne).  In 1019, he associated his son, Frederick, in the government with him.  He briefly opposed the Emperor Conrad II, Henry's successor, but soon joined his supporters.

Family
Theodoric married Richilde, the daughter of Folmar III, count of Bliesgau and Metz, in 985. They had the following children:

Frederick II, his successor
Adela (b. c. 990), married Walram I, count of Arlon
Adalbero
Hildegard, married Fulk III in 1005

He possibly had a daughter, Gisela, who married Gerard de Bouzonville and had a son, Gerard, Duke of Lorraine.

References

Sources

House of Bar
Counts of Bar
Dukes of Upper Lorraine
Medieval child monarchs
960s births
1020s deaths
Year of birth uncertain
Year of death uncertain